This is a list of events that took place in the year 1994 in Azerbaijan.

Incumbents 
 President: Heydar Aliyev
 Prime Minister: Surat Huseynov (until 7 October); Fuad Guliyev (from 7 October)

Overview 
Azerbaijan Gymnastics Federation was the part of International Federation of Gymnastics (FIG).

Association of Football Federations of Azerbaijan became the Member of UEFA and FIFA.

Annual events by month

May

July

September

October

References 

 
Azerbaijan
Years in Azerbaijan